Holeb is an unorganized township in western Maine, United States.

Holeb's history mainly consists of logging and recreational fishing. The Moose River runs a significant length through Holeb's township borders.

The Birch Island House is located within Holeb.

References 

Populated places in Somerset County, Maine